Type II site-specific deoxyribonuclease (type II restriction enzyme) is an enzyme. This enzyme catalyses the following chemical reaction

 Endonucleolytic cleavage of DNA to give specific double-stranded fragments with terminal 5'-phosphates

See also 
 Restriction enzyme

References

External links 
 

EC 3.1.21